The Devil's Playground is a 1946 American Western film directed by George Archainbaud and written by Ted Wilson. The film stars William Boyd, Andy Clyde, Rand Brooks, Elaine Riley and Robert Elliott. The film was released on November 15, 1946, by United Artists.

Plot

Hoppy finds a wounded girl and later finds Judge Morton who claims the girl is his daughter and he is looking for her. But Hoppy soon learns the girl is looking for stolen gold she wants to return and the Judge in not her father but only wants the gold. Hoppy and the girl find the gold but the Judge and his men find Hoppy and the boys and trap them in a cabin.

Cast 
 William Boyd as Hopalong Cassidy
 Andy Clyde as California Carlson
 Rand Brooks as Lucky Jenkins
 Elaine Riley as Mrs. Evans
 Robert Elliott as Judge Morton
 Joseph J. Greene as Sheriff Porky
 Francis McDonald as Henchman Roberts
 Nedrick Young as Curly Evans 
 Earle Hodgins as Deputy Daniel
 George Eldredge as U.S. Marshal
 Everett Shields as Henchman Wolfe
 John George as Shorty

References

External links 
 
 
 
 

1946 films
1946 Western (genre) films
American Western (genre) films
American black-and-white films
Films directed by George Archainbaud
United Artists films
Hopalong Cassidy films
1940s English-language films
1940s American films